Lucca Cathedral is a Roman Catholic cathedral dedicated to Saint Martin of Tours in Lucca, Italy. It is the seat of the Archbishop of Lucca. Construction was begun in 1063 by Bishop Anselm (later Pope Alexander II).

Description
Of the original structure, the great apse with its tall columnar arcades and the fine campanile remain. The nave and transepts of the cathedral were rebuilt in the Gothic style in the 14th century, while the west front was begun in 1204 by Guido Bigarelli of Como, and consists of a vast portico of three magnificent arches, and above them three ranges of open galleries adorned with sculptures.

In the nave a small octagonal temple or chapel shrine contains the most precious relic in Lucca, the Holy Face of Lucca or Sacred Countenance. This cedar-wood crucifix and image of Christ, according to the legend, was carved by his contemporary Nicodemus, and miraculously conveyed to Lucca in 782. Christ is clothed in the colobium, a long sleeveless garment. The chapel was built in 1484 by Matteo Civitali, the most famous Luccan sculptor of the early Renaissance.

The tomb of Ilaria del Carretto by Jacopo della Quercia of Siena, the earliest of his extant works was commissioned by her husband, the lord of Lucca, Paolo Guinigi, in 1406.

Additionally the cathedral contains Domenico Ghirlandaio's Madonna and Child with Saints Peter, Clement, Paul and Sebastian; Federico Zuccari's Adoration of the Magi,  Jacopo Tintoretto's Last Supper, and finally Fra Bartolomeo's Madonna and Child (1509).

There is a legend to explain why all the columns of the façade are different. According to the tale, when they were going to decorate it, the inhabitants of Lucca announced a contest for the best column. Every artist made a column, but then the inhabitants of Lucca decided to take them all, without paying the artists and used all the columns.

Labyrinth
The labyrinth is embedded in the right pier of the portico and is believed to date from the 12th or 13th century. Its importance is that it may well pre-date the famous Chartres labyrinth, yet is of the Chartres pattern that became a standard for labyrinths. The rustic incised Latin inscription refers to ancient pagan mythology: "This is the labyrinth built by Dedalus of Crete; all who entered therein were lost, save Theseus, thanks to Ariadne's thread" (HIC QUEM CRETICUS EDIT. DAEDALUS EST LABERINTHUS . DE QUO NULLUS VADERE . QUIVIT QUI FUIT INTUS . NI THESEUS GRATIS ADRIANE . STAMINE JUTUS").

Burials
Adalbert II of Tuscany
Bertha, daughter of Lothair II

Gallery

See also
Cathedral architecture

Notes and references

External links

HD 360° Panoramic interactive photos of the Cathedral Square by Hans von Weissenfluh for Tuscany tourism promotion official website.

Cathedral
Lucca
Cathedrals in Tuscany
Romanesque architecture in Lucca
Lucca Cathedral
Burial sites of the House of Boniface